Abayomi Wilson is a Nigerian footballer who plays as an attacker for K-Electric in the Pakistan Premier League.

Career

K-Electric 
In August 2014, K-Electric announced signing two Nigerian players including Abayomi Wilson. He made his debut for K-Electric in the 2014 NBP Challenge Cup, He made PPL debut in the 2014-15 Pakistan Premier League. He played thirteen matches and scored just one goal. He also played for K-Electric in the 2016 AFC Cup. However, he scored no goals. Abayomi also played the 2018-19 Pakistan Premier League. He scored two goals and one goal was absolutely phenomenal against Khan Research Laboratories.

References 

1995 births
Nigerian footballers
Living people
K-Electric F.C. players
Association football wingers